The Pittsburgh Xplosion was a professional basketball team based in Pittsburgh, Pennsylvania. Pittsburgh were members of the Continental Basketball Association from 2006 to 2008. Founded in 2004 as the Pittsburgh Hard Hats as a member of the ABA, the team, following an ownership change, took the court as the Pennsylvania Pit Bulls. The team became the Xplosion in 2005, and joined the CBA in 2006. It has been replaced in the ABA with the modern day Pittsburgh Phantoms and later the Pittsburgh Bassets.  The Xplosion played at Pittsburgh Civic Arena and on the campus of the University of Pittsburgh at the Petersen Events Center, both in Pittsburgh, Pennsylvania.

Season by season

|-
|colspan=6 align=center bgcolor="green" | Pennsylvania Pit Bulls (ABA)
|-
|2004-05 || 8 || 9 || .471 || ||
|-
|colspan=6 align=center bgcolor="black" | Pittsburgh Xplosion (ABA)
|-
|2005-06 || 18 || 11 || .621 || Lost Quarterfinals || Bellingham 122, Pittsburgh 115
|-
|colspan=6 align=center bgcolor="black" | Pittsburgh Xplosion (CBA)
|-
|2006-07 || 10 || 38 || .208 || Won Quarterfinals Lost Semifinals || Pittsburgh 119, Indiana 103 Minot 2, Pittsburgh 0
|-
|2007-08 || 29 || 19 || .604 || Won Quarterfinals Lost Semifinals || Pittsburgh 129, East Kentucky 121 Minot 2, Pittsburgh 0

History

Pittsburgh Hardhats
The Pittsburgh Hardhats were an American Basketball Association team based in Pittsburgh, Pennsylvania. The team was created by Joseph Dydek after he failed to start an NBA team in Pittsburgh. To his surprise, the "Hardhats" were not very financially stable.  The team essentially existed on paper only, as it folded prior to the start of the season due to financial difficulties. The team was replaced October 12, 2004, by the Pennsylvania Pit Bulls, who competed in the 2004-2005 ABA season.

Pennsylvania Pit Bulls/Xplosion
After the dissolution of the Hardhats, the Pennsylvania Pit Bulls were admitted to the ABA on October 12, 2004, to play in the 2004-2005 ABA season. They finished with an eight win-nine loss record, good for 7th place in the Blue Division, but not good enough to advance to postseason play. The team's first game (19 November 2004) was marred by the myocardial infarction-induced death of coach Tom Washington, who collapsed on court in the fourth quarter. The game was suspended; assistant coach Pat Blue was tabbed to be the team's head coach for the remainder of the season.

The Pit Bulls played a majority of their home games at Penn State Greater Allegheny, but later moved to McKeesport High School.

For the 2005-2006 season, the Pit Bulls became the Pittsburgh Xplosion. The team finished league competition with an 18 win-11 loss record, good for second place in the Freddie Lewis Division of the ABA White Conference. The Xplosion were eliminated in the playoffs by the Bellingham Slam. The team subsequently left the ABA and entered the Continental Basketball Association, in which it continued to play as the Xplosion through the 2007-08 season.

Former Pitt stars, Antonio Graves, John DeGroat, and Carl Krauser started on the 2008 season roster.

In the 2008 American Conference Finals, the Xplosion lost to the Minot SkyRockets. The SkyRockets won the first two out of three games in Minot, but ceased operations after the 2008 campaign. The Xplosion lasted a little longer, folding just prior to the start of the 2008-09 season, citing the economy.

See also

Pittsburgh Phantoms

References

External links
Official Site
CBA League Site
Point Park University teams up with Xplosion

Basketball teams established in 2004
Basketball teams disestablished in 2008
Continental Basketball Association teams
Defunct basketball teams in Pennsylvania
Xplosion, Pittsburgh
Basketball teams in Pittsburgh
Basketball teams in Pennsylvania
2004 establishments in Pennsylvania
2008 disestablishments in Pennsylvania